Wendi Wells (née Willits born November 18, 1978) is a girls basketball high school head coach in Shawnee, Oklahoma since 2008. Before starting her head coaching tenure, Willits had 3,345 points while playing high school basketball in Fort Cobb, Oklahoma. With the Arkansas Razorbacks women's basketball team from 1997 to 2001, Willits had 1574 points and set an Arkansas career record with 316 three-pointers. As part of the Razorbacks, Willits and her team reached the final four during the 1998 NCAA Division I women's basketball tournament and won the 1999 Women's National Invitation Tournament. After joining the Los Angeles Sparks in 2001, Willits and the team won the 2001 WNBA Championship. As an assistant coach, Willits worked for the University of West Georgia and Shawnee High School in the early to late 2000s.

Early life and education
Wendi Willits was born in Chickasha, Oklahoma on November 18, 1978. During her childhood, Willits started playing basketball as a toddler and grew up in Fort Cobb, Oklahoma. At Fort Cobb-Broxton, Willits played in 128 girls basketball games and scored 3,345 points. During her final year in high school, Willits was named player of the year by The Oklahoman in 1997. For her post-secondary education, Willits went to the University of Arkansas to study exercise physiology. 

While at Arkansas from 1997 to 2001, Willits played on the Arkansas Razorbacks women's basketball team. In college tournaments, Willits and the Razorbacks made it to the final four at the 1998 NCAA Division I women's basketball tournament and won the 1999 Women's National Invitation Tournament. During her 131 games with the Razorbacks, Willits had 1574 points overall. Leading up to the 2020-2021 season, Willits was seventh in all-time career points for Arkansas. With 316 three-pointers, Willits has held the Arkansas career record for almost twenty years. She also received the Ed Steitz Award in 1999 for having the highest three point percentage in NCAA Division I schools.

Arkansas statistics

Source

Career
In 2001, Willits started her WNBA career when she joined the Los Angeles Sparks. During her only season with the Sparks, Willits played in thirteen regular season games and had seventeen points. That season, Willits played in four playoffs games and scored zero points. Of her playoff games, Willits played in the 2001 WNBA Championship where she and the Sparks defeated the Charlotte Sting. After being let go by the Sparks, Willits moved to Florida for employment.

After leaving the WNBA, Willits started her assistant coaching tenure with the University of West Georgia in 2003. After leaving for Shawnee High School in 2006, Willits continued her assistant coaching tenure until 2008. In December 2008, Wendi Wells began her girls basketball head coaching experience with Swahnee. During her head coach tenure, Wells won her hundredth game in 2013. Leading up to the 2020-2021 season, Wells had 194 wins and 50 losses with Shawnee.

Personal life
Wells is married and has one child.

References

1978 births
Arkansas Razorbacks women's basketball players
Los Angeles Sparks players
High school basketball coaches in Oklahoma
Living people
People from Chickasha, Oklahoma
People from Caddo County, Oklahoma